Comic Strip Live was a weekly, late-night, hour-long stand-up comedy showcase that aired on the Fox network from 1989 to 1994.  It started as a local show at Igby's comedy club, originally hosted by John Mulrooney and filmed at the club. Jamie Masada, owner of the Laugh Factory, proposed that they take the show national; Fox agreed, and moved the show to the Laugh Factory in Hollywood.  Mulrooney was replaced by Gary Kroeger for the second season, then Wayne Cotter for the remaining seasons.

The show was successful enough that Fox created a prime time version called The Sunday Comics.

See also
List of late night network TV programs

References

External links
 

1980s American late-night television series
1990s American late-night television series
1989 American television series debuts
1994 American television series endings
Fox late-night programming